Christopher Anthony Laskowski (born September 12, 1981) was an American football linebacker turned safety, with the Indianapolis Colts. In August 2006, the Colts placed him on injured reserve with a sports hernia injury, then reached an injury settlement with him and released him from the team.

High school years
Laskowski attended Rockledge High School in Rockledge, Florida, and was a letterwinner in American football, wrestling and baseball. In football, he was an All-Conference honoree and an All-State honoree. In wrestling, he was twice a State Qualifier. In baseball, he won All-Conference honors. Laskowski graduated from Rockledge High School in 2000.

College years
As a freshman at Florida Atlantic University, he was a walk-on to the university's first football team in 2000. He was named the team Most Valuable Player (MVP) in 2002, and co-MVP in his final two years, and was invited to the Hula Bowl as a senior. In 2005, the Colts signed him as an undrafted free agent, cut him during the pre-season, and re-signed him to their practice squad. In January 2006, Laskowski was re-signed as a safety and began training camp in July.

References

 Ed Thompson, "Laskowski's Out To Prove That He's Special", Scout.com,  June 27, 2005
 Ed Thompson, "Breaking News: Colts Shuffle Practice Squad", Scout.com, December 6, 2005

1981 births
Living people
People from Melbourne, Florida
American football linebackers
American football safeties
Florida Atlantic Owls football players
Indianapolis Colts players